Red Soul is an album by saxophonist Red Holloway recorded in 1965 and released on the Prestige label.

Reception

Allmusic awarded the album 3 stars stating "Good to get, if you can find it".

Track listing 
All compositions by George Benson except where noted.
 "Making Tracks" – 3:00   
 "Movin' On" – 3:27   
 "Good & Groovy" – 4:02   
 "Get It Together" – 3:32   
 "Big Fat Lady" – 1:55   
 "A Tear in My Heart" (Norman Simmons) - 6:20   
 "Eagle Jaws" (Red Holloway) - 2:45   
 "I'm All Packed" (Simmons) - 5:05   
 "The Regulars" (Harold Ousley) - 4:14

Personnel 
Red Holloway - tenor saxophone
George Benson - guitar
Dr. Lonnie Smith - organ (tracks 1-5)
Norman Simmons - piano (tracks 6-9)
Chuck Rainey - electric bass (tracks 1-5)
Paul Breslin - bass (tracks 6-9)
Ray Lucas (tracks 1-5), Frank Severino (tracks 6-9) - drums

References 

Red Holloway albums
Jack McDuff albums
1966 albums
Prestige Records albums